Rezanov is a Russian masculine surname, its feminine counterpart is Rezanova. It may refer to
Nikolai Rezanov (1764–1807), Russian nobleman and statesman
Oleksandr Rezanov (born 1948), Soviet/Ukrainian handball player

See also
Ryazanov

Russian-language surnames